Renate Fischer (born 1 July 1943) is a former East German cross-country skier who competed in the late 1960s and early 1970s. She earned a silver medal in the 3 × 5 km relay at the 1970 FIS Nordic World Ski Championships in Vysoké Tatry. She also competed at the 1968 Winter Olympics and the 1972 Winter Olympics.

Cross-country skiing results

Olympic Games

World Championships
1 medal – (1 silver)

References

External links
World Championship results 

1943 births
German female cross-country skiers
Living people
FIS Nordic World Ski Championships medalists in cross-country skiing
Olympic cross-country skiers of East Germany
Cross-country skiers at the 1968 Winter Olympics
Cross-country skiers at the 1972 Winter Olympics